Derbyshire County Cricket Club in 1953 was the cricket season when the English club Derbyshire had been playing for eighty two years. It was their fifty-ninth  season in the County Championship and they won nine matches and lost seven to  finish sixth in the County Championship.

1953 season

Derbyshire played 28 games in the County Championship, one match against Oxford University and one match against the touring Australians. They won nine  matches altogether.  Guy Willatt was in his third year as captain. Charlie Elliott was top scorer and C Gladwin took most wickets with 121.

Reginald Carter made his debut and continued to play for three seasons.  David Green also made his debut and played intermittently over several seasons.

Matches

{| class="wikitable" width="100%"
! bgcolor="#efefef" colspan=6 | List of  matches
|- bgcolor="#efefef"
!No.
!Date
!V
!Result 
!Margin
!Notes
 |- 
|1
|13 May 1953  
|Middlesex    Lord's Cricket Ground, St John's Wood
|bgcolor="#FFCC00"|Drawn
| 
|    Sharp 107
|- 
|2
|16 May 1953
| Glamorgan   Queen's Park, Chesterfield  
|bgcolor="#FFCC00"|Drawn
| 
|    Jones 114; C Gladwin 5-75 
|- 
|3
| 20 May 1953 
| SomersetCounty Ground, Taunton 
|bgcolor="#00FF00"|Won 
| Innings and 21 runs
|    AC Revill  111; HL Jackson 5-51; Buse 5-61 
|- 
|4
|23 May 1953
| Warwickshire  Edgbaston, Birmingham
|bgcolor="#FF0000"|Lost 
| 200 runs
|    Hollies 5-23
|- 
|5
|27 May 1953  
|  Sussex    County Ground, Derby  
|bgcolor="#FFCC00"|Drawn
| 
|    Langridge 127; AC Revill  107
|- 
|6
|30 May 1953   
|  Worcestershire Ind Coope Ground, Burton-on-Trent  
|bgcolor="#00FF00"|Won 
| 3 wickets
|    Jenkins 5-64; HL Jackson 5-35
|- 
|7
|03 Jun 1953  
|  Surrey Kennington Oval 
|bgcolor="#FF0000"|Lost 
| 8 wickets
|    Bedser 5-42; C Gladwin 8-50 
|- 
|8
|06 Jun 1953 
| Glamorgan   Ynysangharad Park, Pontypridd 
|bgcolor="#FF0000"|Lost 
| 13 runs
|    HL Jackson 5-51; Wooller 5-66; C Gladwin 5-67 
|- 
|9
|10 Jun 1953 
| Oxford University    The University Parks, Oxford 
|bgcolor="#FFCC00"|Drawn
| 
|    
|- 
|10
|13 Jun 1953  
| Lancashire   Old Trafford, Manchester  
|bgcolor="#FFCC00"|Drawn
| 
|    
|- 
|11
|17 Jun 1953 
| Australians   Queen's Park, Chesterfield 
|bgcolor="#FFCC00"|Drawn
| 
|    C Gladwin 5-84; E Smith 5-36 
|- 
|12
| 20 Jun 1953  
|  Surrey County Ground, Derby
|bgcolor="#00FF00"|Won 
| Innings and 1 run
|    HL Jackson 5-34; C Gladwin 5-47 
|- 
|13
| 27 Jun 1953
| Nottinghamshire  Rutland Recreation Ground, Ilkeston  
|bgcolor="#00FF00"|Won 
| 7 wickets
|    A Hamer 115
|- 
|14
|01 Jul 1953  
| Northamptonshire  Queen's Park, Chesterfield 
|bgcolor="#FFCC00"|Drawn
| 
|    Barrick 161; CS Elliott 132; Brookes 116 
|- 
|15
|04 Jul 1953 
| Nottinghamshire   Trent Bridge, Nottingham 
|bgcolor="#FF0000"|Lost 
| 10 wickets
|    Simpson 114; Stocks 140
|- 
|16
|08 Jul 1953   
| Kent  Queen's Park, Chesterfield 
|bgcolor="#FFCC00"|Drawn
| 
|   AC Revill 128
|- 
|17
|11 Jul 1953 
| Leicestershire Bath Grounds, Ashby-de-la-Zouch 
|bgcolor="#FF0000"|Lost 
| 41 runs
|    C Gladwin 6-30; V Jackson 5-23 and 5-34
|- 
|18
|15 Jul 1953  
|Middlesex    County Ground, Derby 
|bgcolor="#FFCC00"|Drawn
| 
|    Sharp 103; Robertson 127; HL Jackson 5-44 
|- 
|19
|18 Jul 1953 
| Yorkshire Queen's Park, Chesterfield 
|bgcolor="#00FF00"|Won 
| 10 wickets
|    A Hamer 153; C Gladwin 5-44 
|- 
|20
|22 Jul 1953
|  WorcestershireTipton Road, Dudley
|bgcolor="#FFCC00"|Drawn
| 
|    DB Carr 111 
|- 
|21
|25 Jul 1953  
| Lancashire    Queen's Park, Chesterfield  
|bgcolor="#00FF00"|Won 
| 49 runs
|    Berry 6-58 
|- 
|22
|01 Aug 1953 
|  Warwickshire County Ground, Derby 
|bgcolor="#FFCC00"|Drawn
| 
|    Gardner 143
|- 
|23
|05 Aug 1953
|  Sussex   County Ground, Hove 
|bgcolor="#FFCC00"|Drawn
| 
|    Suttle 103; Parks 124
|- 
|24
|08 Aug 1953  
| Northamptonshire  Wellingborough School Ground 
|bgcolor="#FF0000"|Lost 
| 3 wickets
|    
|- 
|25
|12 Aug 1953 
| Yorkshire North Marine Road Ground, Scarborough 
|bgcolor="#FF0000"|Lost 
| 109 runs
|    Wardle 5-52; Holdsworth 6-58
|- 
|26
|15 Aug 1953
| Leicestershire   County Ground, Derby 
|bgcolor="#00FF00"|Won 
| 10 wickets
|    Walsh 5-64; HL Jackson 5-36
|- 
|27
|19 Aug 1953 
| SomersetQueen's Park, Chesterfield
|bgcolor="#00FF00"|Won 
| Innings and 82 runs
|    R Carter 7-46 
|- 
|28 
|22 Aug 1953 
| Essex   Park Road Ground, Buxton 
|Abandoned 
| 
|    
|- 
|29
|26 Aug 1953 
| HampshireCounty Ground, Southampton 
|bgcolor="#00FF00"|Won 
| 158 runs 
|    C Gladwin 5-40; Knott 5-36
|- 
|30
|29 Aug 1953  
|  Gloucestershire   Ashley Down Ground, Bristol
|bgcolor="#FFCC00"|Drawn
| 
|    DC Morgan 5-35; Graveney 5-28 
|-

Statistics

County Championship batting averages

County Championship bowling averages

Wicket Keepers
GO Dawkes 	Catches 46, Stumping 7

See also
Derbyshire County Cricket Club seasons
1953 English cricket season

References

1953 in English cricket
Derbyshire County Cricket Club seasons